Yoon Young-kwan (born January 12, 1951) is a South Korean academic and politician, who was the Foreign Minister of South Korea in 2003.

Yoon is a professor emeritus at Seoul National University's Department of Political Science and International Relations and taught courses on International Political Economy, Introduction to International Relations, and South-North Korean relations. He began teaching at the department in 1990. Before he joined the faculty of Seoul National University, he taught at the University of California, Davis for 3 years.

He was appointed as the 32nd Foreign Minister of South Korea on February 27, 2003. He resigned from this post on January 15, 2004. He served as Korea's eminent representative to and the co-chair of the East Asia Vision Group II for the ASEAN+3 Summit Meeting from September 2011 to October 2012.

Yoon has published several books and about 70 articles in the field of international political economy, Korea's foreign policy, and inter-Korean relations. He was the recipient of the Korean Government Scholarship (1981–85), the Best Book Award (by the Korean Association of International Studies) (1996), and the Best Teachers' Award (Seoul National University) (2015).

Education
Yoon received his B.A. and M.A. in International Relations from Seoul National University in 1975 and 1977, respectively.

After completing his military service as a lecturer in International Law at the Republic of Korea Naval Academy, he went on to receive a master's degree (1983) and a Ph.D. at Johns Hopkins University's School of Advanced International Studies (SAIS) in 1987 ("Political Economy of Foreign Investment and Productivity: A Historical Observation and Industry-Specific Case Studies").

References

External links
Prof. Yoon Young-kwan's Homepage

1951 births
Living people
Paul H. Nitze School of Advanced International Studies alumni
Foreign ministers of South Korea
Seoul National University alumni
Academic staff of Seoul National University
University of California, Davis faculty